Arthur Theodore Kruger (March 16, 1881 – November 28, 1949) was a professional baseball player who played outfielder in the Major Leagues from -. He would play for the Cincinnati Reds, Cleveland Naps, Boston Braves, and Kansas City Packers.

External links

1881 births
1949 deaths
Major League Baseball outfielders
Baseball players from San Antonio
Cincinnati Reds players
Cleveland Naps players
Boston Braves players
Kansas City Packers players
Rockford Red Sox players
Oakland Oaks (baseball) players
Stockton Millers players
Columbus Senators players
Portland Beavers players
Los Angeles Angels (minor league) players